William Johnson (by 1523 – 1553 or later), of Kingston upon Hull, Yorkshire, was an English politician.

He was a Member (MP) of the Parliament of England for Kingston upon Hull in March and October 1553.

References

Year of birth missing
1553 deaths
Year of death unknown
Politicians from Kingston upon Hull
English MPs 1553 (Edward VI)
English MPs 1553 (Mary I)